PEAC is an abbreviation that may refer to:
 Pacific East Asia Cargo Airlines, as an unofficial abbreviation for a Philippine airline
 Pathobiology of Early Arthritis Cohort (PEAC), an MRC funded arthritis study
 Private Education Assistance Committee, sole trustee of the Fund for Assistance to Private Education
 Daskalakis Athletic Center, as a former name for this facility, "PEAC" or "Physical Education and Athletic Center"
 Savicol, as a former name for this drug, "PEAC" or "Pulse Enhanced ACetylation"